The 1920 Pembroke election to the Pembroke Urban District Council took place on Thursday 15 January 1920 as part of that year's Irish local elections.

Four candidates, including Dench (previously a nationalist councillor), and Forsyth (a Protestant Home Ruler, and the incumbent council Chairman) ran on a Ratepayers Association ticket, which was silent on the national question. Along with keeping rates down, the grouping was committed to improved housing accommodation for the working classes, extending facilities to plotholders, better street lighting, the erection of a Free Carnegie Library, improved technical education, and providing wash houses where necessary.

Results by party

Results by electoral area
* indicates outgoing councillor.

East Ward

West Ward

Notes

References

1920 Irish local elections
Elections in County Dublin